X-Men: The Manga, published simply as X-Men in Japan published by Marvel Comics. It is a manga adaptation of the 1992 X-Men animated series. It was published directly to tankobon format by Takeshobo in 1994 under their Bamboo Comics imprint in order to promote the Japanese airing of the show. The first volume was published and the publication date is from March 1998 - April 1999. Therefore, manga lasted 13 volumes, each volume adapting two episodes from the TV series (thus covering the first two seasons), with a different manga artist drawing each story. In addition to the books, Takeshobo also published a manga tie-in to the X-Men: Children of the Atom arcade game drawn by Miyako Cojima that was published in Comic Gamma from 1994 to 1995, but was not collected in book form. In 1998, Marvel Comics adapted the manga into English as a monthly title, publishing 26 issues covering the first 13 stories.

List of volumes (Japanese edition)

See also 
 

X-Men titles
Manga series
1998 comics debuts
Superheroes in anime and manga
Takeshobo manga
Manga based on comics